Eucalyptus redimiculifera is a species of tree that is endemic to a small area in Western Australia. It has smooth bark, lance-shaped adult leaves, flower buds in groups of seven, white flowers and oval fruit.

Description
It has smooth white to grey or pink bark that is shed in long ribbons.

Taxonomy and naming
The specific epithet (redimiculifera) is from the Latin redimiculum meaning a "band" or "fetter" and -fer meaning "-bearing", referring to the shed bark encircling the smaller branches.

Distribution and habitat
This eucalypt is locally abundant in open woodland in a scattered population near Norseman.

See also
List of Eucalyptus species

References

Eucalypts of Western Australia
Trees of Australia
redimiculifera
Myrtales of Australia
Plants described in 2001
Taxa named by Lawrence Alexander Sidney Johnson
Taxa named by Ken Hill (botanist)